Donna Detective is an Italian television series.

See also
List of Italian television series

External links
 
 Donna Detective at RAI TV

Italian crime television series
RAI original programming
2007 Italian television series debuts
2010 Italian television series endings
2000s Italian television series
2010s Italian television series